Events from the year 1684 in Sweden

Incumbents
 Monarch – Charles XI

Events

  
 
  
 The religious process against the visionary Eva Margareta Frölich in Stockholm.

Births

 Brigitta Scherzenfeldt, memoirist and weaving teacher who was captured during the Great Northern War and lived as a slave in the Dzungar Khanate in Central Asia (died 1736).

Deaths

References

 
Years of the 17th century in Sweden
Sweden